Michael Donald Healy (August 28, 1936 – April 2, 2020) was an American football defensive tackle in the National Football League for the Chicago Bears and Dallas Cowboys. He also was a member of the Buffalo Bills in the American Football League. He played college football at the University of Maryland.

Early years
Healy attended Rome Free Academy, where he received honorable-mention All-state honors in football. He also practiced baseball and hockey.

He accepted a football scholarship from the University of Maryland. He played as a two-way tackle and was a three-year starter.

He was a part of the 1958 College All Star team that defeated the 1957 NFL Champion Detroit Lions. His teammates included Alex Karras, Ray Nitschke and Chuck Howley. He also took part in the Senior Bowl and the East–West Shrine Game.

Professional career

Chicago Bears
Healy was selected by the Chicago Bears in the third round (37th overall) of the 1958 NFL Draft. He played two seasons and was a backup offensive guard.

Dallas Cowboys
He was selected by the Dallas Cowboys in the 1960 NFL Expansion Draft, becoming the first starter at left defensive tackle in franchise history. He holds the single-season Cowboys record for fumble recoveries (5 in 1961), established when the regular season was 14 games long. He was released on September 7, 1962.

Buffalo Bills
In 1962, he played for the Buffalo Bills of the American Football League.

Personal life
He died on April 2, 2020, in Naples, Florida, at age 83.

References

1936 births
2020 deaths
Sportspeople from Rome, New York
American football defensive tackles
Maryland Terrapins football players
Chicago Bears players
Dallas Cowboys players
American Football League players
Buffalo Bills players